A Celtic Journey is an album by Méav Ní Mhaolchatha. It was released in 2006 by EMI-Manhattan.

Track listing

Personnel
Musicians
David Agnew - Oboe, recorder
David Downes - Keyboards, Uillean pipes, whistle
Andreja Malir - Harp
Méav - Vocals
Technical
David Agnew - Producer
Bobby Boughton - Engineer
David Downes - Producer
Tony Harris - Engineer
Brian Masterson - Engineer
Bill Somerville-Large - Engineer

References

2006 albums
Méav Ní Mhaolchatha albums